Tullycraft released the 1st String Teenage High 7" EP on the German label Little Teddy Recordings in 1996. The four songs were exclusive, but reappeared on The Singles CD released in 1999. The songs were recorded and mixed at Yoyo Studios in Olympia, Washington.

Track listing
 A1 1st String Teenage High
 A2 Not Quite Burning Bridges
 B1 Piano Lessons For Beauty Queens
 B2 Stay Cool I'll See You This Summer

Personnel
 Sean Tollefson – vocals, bass
 Jeff Fell – drums
 Gary Miklusek – guitar, backing vocals
 Pat Maley – production, audio engineering
 Aaron Gorseth – production assistance

References 

 Strong, M. C. (2003). The Great Indie Discography (2nd Edition) pg. 1041. Published by Canon Books Ltd. (US/CAN) .
 Discogs . 1st String Teenage High. Retrieved on November 15, 2008.

1990 EPs